Waterloo and Robinson is an Austrian band, consisting of Johann Kreuzmayr ("Waterloo") and Josef Krassnitzer ("Robinson"). 
The duo are most famous for representing Austria in the Eurovision Song Contest 1976, performing the song My Little World, where they recorded a 5th-place finish with 80 points. This song was also the first time that Austria had performed entirely in English at the Contest.

More recently, the duo entered preselection to represent Austria at the 2004 Contest, losing out to boyband Tie Break. This caused some controversy when Waterloo and Robinson protested that Tie Break's song (Du Bist) was longer than the 3 minutes allowed under Contest rules - clocking in at between 3:09 and 3:11 depending on the stereo used.
The duo were quoted as saying "If skiers battle over the tenth part of a second, we must be allowed to go to court because of a time exceeding of 5%" as well as filing a legal challenge to Tie Break's performance . This challenge was not upheld.

Discography

Albums 

 1974 – Sing my song
 1975 - Please love me
 1975 - Unsere Lieder
 1976 - Songs
 1976 - Clap your hands
 1976 - The best of Waterloo & Robinson 1971 - 1976 (Double-LP)
 1977 - Hollywood - The best of Waterloo & Robinson (just in Germany)
 1977 - Successen (just in Netherlands)
 1977 - Beautiful time
 1977 - The Original
 1977 - Weihnachten mit Waterloo & Robinson (Maxisingle)
 1978 - Wild, wild land
 1980 - Brand new start
 1980 - Ich denke oft an...
 1981 - Spiegelbilder
 1982 - Unsere schönsten Lieder
 1982 - Ihre 16 größten Erfolge
 1988 - Poptakes
 1992 - Weihnachten mit Waterloo & Robinson
 1994 - Powertime
 1995 - Private Collection
 1998 – Master Series
 1999 - Hollywood 2000
 2002 - Marianne

Singles

 1971 - Du kannst sehen
 1972 - Sag´ woher wehst du Wind
 1972 - Lili´s Haus
 1973 - Mamy & Dad
 1973 - Sailor
 1973 - Waterloo & Robinson Song
 1974 - Baby Blue
 1974 - Hollywood
 1974 - Das war Hollywood von gestern
 1974 - Midnight movie (just in Great Britain)
 1975 - Old times again
 1975 - Straßen der Nacht
 1975 - Walk away
 1975 - Geh zu ihr
 1976 - My little world
 1976 - Meine kleine Welt
 1976 - Danke schön!
 1976 - Sunday 16
 1976 - My, my, my
 1976 - Du bist frei
 1977 - Hide away
 1977 - Stille Nacht
 1977 - Cadillac Cafe
 1978 - Unser kleines Team
 1978 - Im Garten Eden
 1978 - Himmel, Donner, Arm und Zwirn
 1978 - Chocolata
 1978 - Bye, bye, bye little butterfly
 1979 - Do you remember Marianne
 1979 - Ich denk´ noch oft an Marianne
 1979 - Sally, they´re selling the army
 1980 - Du, die verkaufen die Army
 1980 - Eleonora
 1981 - Frühstück in Berlin
 1992 - Barcelona
 1996 - Crema
 1997 - Write on
 1998 - Willkommen Österreich
 2000 - 2gether we r strong (Waterloo & Robinson feat. Panah)
 2000 - In der schönen Weihnachtszeit (Waterloo & Robinson & Kindergarten Walding)
 2002 - Na Naa.Nanana Live is life
 2003 - Marilyn
 2004 - You can change the world

External links 
www.waterloo.at

Austrian pop music groups
Australian musical duos
Eurovision Song Contest entrants for Austria
Eurovision Song Contest entrants of 1976